Mongolian draughts (daam, from French dame) is the local variant of draughts played in Mongolia. International draughts is also popular in Mongolia, with Mongolia sending high-scoring teams to Asian Draughts Championships (gold, silver and bronze in Kuala Lumpur, 2012), and a team to the World Mind Sports Games.

See also
 List of abstract strategy games for Shatar and Hiashatar (Mongolian chess variants)

References

Draughts variants
Mongolian games
Mongolian inventions